New England Baptist College is a Christian college located 1541 West Street in Southington, Connecticut.

It was founded in 2004 and is affiliated with the nearby Central Baptist Church and Central Christian Academy. It is an unaccredited Independent Fundamental Baptist College that trains young people to serve in various capacities of ministry. Founded in 2004 by Jim Townsley, New England Baptist College encourages students to give their hearts to God and to fulfill His purpose in their life.

External links
Official website

Educational institutions established in 2004
Universities and colleges in Hartford County, Connecticut
Unaccredited Christian universities and colleges
Bible colleges
Unaccredited Christian universities and colleges in the United States
2004 establishments in Connecticut
Seminaries and theological colleges in Connecticut